Aaron Henry (born 5 August 1992) is a New Zealand professional wrestler currently signed to New Japan Pro-Wrestling (NJPW) under the ring name Aaron Henare (アーロン・ヘナーレ).

Early life 
Henry was born in Auckland, New Zealand, and competed in both amateur wrestling and mixed martial arts prior to becoming a professional wrestler. He is of Cook Islander/Māori descent with Ngāpuhi and Ngāi Takoto links. His uncle is former professional rugby league player Richie Barnett, who captained New Zealand at the 2000 Rugby League World Cup.

Professional wrestling career

New Japan Pro-Wrestling (2016–present)

Early beginnings (2016–2021)

Henare signed with NJPW in early 2016 and debuted in September of that year, losing to Pro Wrestling Noah's Quiet Storm at Lion's Gate Project 3. Henare's first win in NJPW came on 6 September, when he defeated fellow young lion Hirai Kawato. He appeared on his first major NJPW show, Destruction in Tokyo on 17 September, teaming with David Finlay in a losing effort against Roppongi Vice. On 12 November, Henare returned to his home city of Auckland, New Zealand, defeating Hikule'o at a Bad Luck Fale produced show. Henare entered the 2016 World Tag League alongside veteran Manabu Nakanishi. The two finished last in their block with zero wins and zero points. On 21 February 2017, in a match with Tomoyuki Oka, Henare suffered an Achilles tendon injury and the match had to be stopped. He was taken out on a stretcher. Henare returned in November for the 2017 World Tag League, where he teamed with Togi Makabe. The two finished the tournament with a record of one win and six losses. On the Wrestle Kingdom 12 pre-show on 4 January 2018, Henare debuted under the new ring name Toa Henare. On 27 January, at the New Beginning in Sapporo, Toa received his first title shot when he teamed up with Ryusuke Taguchi and Togi Makabe to unsuccessfully challenge the Guerillas of Destiny and Bad Luck Fale for the NEVER Openweight 6-Man Tag Team Championship.

In 2019, Toa teamed with Hiroshi Tanahashi for the World Tag League, finishing with 3 wins and 12 losses. The next year, the duo teamed again now dubbed as "HenarACE", only this time, they got only one win.

United Empire (2021–present) 
On April 4, 2021, Henare, now going by the ring name Aaron Henare, was revealed as the new member of Will Ospreay's United Empire faction, turning heel in the process, as he teamed up with new stablemates Great-O-Khan and Jeff Cobb to defeat the Los Ingobernables de Japón team of Tetsuya Naito, Shingo Takagi, and Sanada at the Sakura Genesis 2021 event. Henare teamed with O-Khan in the World Tag League, where they finished with a total of 14 points, failing to advance to the finals. At Wrestle Kingdom 16, Henare entered but failed to win the New Japan Rambo match. 

Henare entered his first Heavyweight singles tournament in NJPW, in the New Japan Cup. He beat Yuto Nakashima in round one but lost to then IWGP United States Heavyweight Champion Sanada in round 2.  Henare made his NJPW Strong debut in America, teaming with O-Khan and new United Empire member TJP, to defeat Brody King, Mascara Dorada and Taylor Rust. At Windy City Riot, Henare teamed with, Cobb, O-Khan and new members, Aussie Open (Mark Davis and Kyle Fletcher ) to defeat Bullet Club. In May, Henare made his Revolution Pro Wrestling debut, losing to Ricky Knight Jr. In June, Henare was announced for the G1 Climax 32 tournament as apart of the C Block, making his G1 debut. Henare finished last in his block with only 2 points, however the only win came against former partner and 3 time G1 Champion, Hiroshi Tanahashi.

All Elite Wrestling (2022–present)

On the June 8th episode of AEW Dynamite, Henare along with United Empire stablemates Kyle Fletcher and Mark Davis of Aussie Open, made their All Elite Wrestling debuts, assisting stable leader Will Ospreay in attacking Trent Beretta and FTR.

Championships and accomplishments
Impact Pro Wrestling
IPW New Zealand Tag Team Championship (1 time) – with Jakob Cross
Armageddon Cup (2014)
Pro Wrestling Illustrated
Ranked No. 250 of the top 500 singles wrestlers in the PWI 500 in 2018

References

External links

1992 births
Living people
Sportspeople from Auckland
New Zealand male professional wrestlers
New Zealand expatriate sportspeople in Japan
Expatriate professional wrestlers in Japan
New Zealand people of Cook Island descent
New Zealand Māori people